This was the first edition of the tournament.

Hsieh Su-wei and Monica Niculescu won the title, defeating Timea Bacsinszky and Martina Hingis in the final, 5–7, 6–3, [10–7].

Seeds

Draw

References
Main Draw

Ladies Open Biel Bienne - Doubles
Ladies Open Lugano
Lugano